Charles Davenport is a former professional American football wide receiver who played in the National Football League (NFL) for the Pittsburgh Steelers.

References

1968 births
American football wide receivers
American football quarterbacks
Pittsburgh Steelers players
NC State Wolfpack football players
Living people
Players of American football from North Carolina
Sportspeople from Fayetteville, North Carolina